The Sugar refinery of Tienen, a subsidiary of Raffinerie Tirlemontoise Group (RT Group), is a Belgian sugar producing company. The company whose headquarters is located in Tienen (Belgium) has four business units: sugar activities, Orafti, Surafti and PPE, which together employ more than 1,800 people.

The company operates two sugar refineries in Belgium: Tienen (12,500 tons of beets per day) and Wanze with a refinery in Longchamps (16,500 tons of beets per day).

History
The sugar beet industry in Europe and Belgium has its roots in the Continental System of Napoleon I in his struggle against the United Kingdom of Great Britain and Ireland during the Napoleonic Wars. Sugar from sugar beets was increasingly used as an alternative for sugarcane, when in 1807 the British began a blockade of France, which prevented the import of sugarcane from the Caribbean.

The Sugar refinery of Tienen itself was founded in 1836 and in the early years production was about 10 sacks of raw sugar per day. By 1880, sugar beet cultivation rose to 1,000 tonnes. In 1894 Paul Wittouck and his brother, Frans, took over Vinckenbosch & Cie, owner of the sugar refinery of Tienen, and turned it into a limited company. The brothers faced fierce competition from other sugar manufacturers in Belgium, but emerged as the dominant firm. Through a series of technical innovations and improvement the volume of sugar produced in Tienen rose from 7,000 tonnes in 1894 to 62,000 tonnes in 1913. The company began to export sugar and to take over other Belgian companies.

In 1931, the Chadbourne plan was the first international agreement on sugar production, but due to international overproduction the situation of the sugar industry remained difficult until the end of World War II.

In 1949, F. Baerts, J. Dedek and G. Tibo of the Sugar refinery of Tienen invited several scientists form the European sugar industry to Brussels on 18 September 1949. This would lead to the foundation of the Commission Internationale Technique de Sucrerie (CITS).

In 1950, the production of white sugar started with 399,000 tonnes produced that year. After the establishment of the European Union in 1958, the common agricultural policy led to the regulation of the European sugar market in 1968. In 1987 25 percent of the shares of the company were registered on the Brussels Stock Exchange and in 1989 Südzucker bought all shares of the company. In 1999 the company decided to install a seed magma preparation installation in the Tienen plant to reduce production costs and to improve the quality of the sugar.

See also
 Carbonatation
 Citrique Belge
Wittouck family

References

Sources

 Sugar museum Tienen
 Sugar industry of belgium (Dutch)
 Purification of Sugar Refinery effluents by the anaerobic- aerobic UNITANK system (EU)

External links
 Sugar refinery of Tienen
 

Agriculture companies of Belgium
Sugar companies
Tienen
Companies based in Flemish Brabant